Paul Amos (born 8 August 1975 from Catford) is a former English professional darts player who competes in Professional Darts Corporation events.

Career
Amos qualified for the 2012 UK Open and beat Gary Ettridge, Geoff Heath and Wayne Jones, before losing 9–6 to Vincent van der Voort in the third round.

The following year, he reached the round of 16 of a PDC event for the first time at the UK Open Qualifier, but was beaten 6–1 by Jamie Caven. At the 2013 UK Open itself he lost 5–1 to Adam Hunt in the second round. At the Gibraltar Darts Trophy, Amos beat 2008 BDO world champion Mark Webster 6–4 and then missed one match dart in the second round against Peter Wright to lose 6–5. He reached the same stage of the German Darts Masters by defeating three-time world champion John Part 6–5, before losing 6–1 against Steve Beaton.

In 2014, Amos could not advance beyond the last 64 of any of the 36 events he entered. In 2015 he played in all 16 of the Challenge Tour events with his best results being two last 32 defeats.
It was a similar story in 2016 as he participated in 12 Challenge Tours and twice got to the last 32.

References

External links

Living people
Professional Darts Corporation former tour card holders
English darts players
1975 births